Ergon may refer to:

 Ergon, alien from the Doctor Who serial Arc of Infinity
 Ergon, concept from Aristotle's Nicomachean Ethics that is most often translated as function, task, or work
 Ergon, Inc., petroleum company based in Jackson, Mississippi
 Ergon Energy, electricity company owned by the Government of Queensland

See also
 Potentiality and actuality (Ancient Greek: ἔργον)
 Erg, unit of energy
 Tri-Ergon, sound production technology